Michelle Gould may refer to:

 Michelle Gould (racquetball) (born 1970), American racquetball player
 Michelle Gould, member of the Canadian folk-pop duo Lava Hay